Tomàs Padró i Pedret (11 February 1840, Barcelona - 16 April 1877, Barcelona) was a Catalan painter, graphic artist and illustrator.

Biography 
He was born to a family of artists. His father, was a sculptor. His younger brother, also became a painter. He studied at the Escola de la Llotja with Claudi Lorenzale, then at the Real Academia de Bellas Artes de San Fernando in Madrid, where his instructors included Carlos Luis de Ribera and Federico de Madrazo. His fellow student, Marià Fortuny, introduced him to the drawings of Paul Gavarni.

In 1867, he went to France with the writer, to illustrate his work La Exposición Universal de París. In 1868, he painted the stained glass windows in the apse of the church of Santa Maria del Pi and a portrait of the abbess at the convent of San Juan de Jerusalén. The following year, he entered and won a competition for a  position as Professor of drawing at the school for deaf-mutes. He taught there, periodically, until his resignation in 1875. 

The peak period of his work as an illustrator coincided with the "Glorious Revolution" of 1868. He was married in 1870, and had three children. During the short reign of King Amadeo I, he lived in Cartagena, where he worked as an artistic correspondent for La Ilustración Española y Americana.

His most significant book illustrations were for La Historia de España, by Modesto Lafuente, and his best remembered journalistic drawings were for the satirical magazine, . Also notable were those for El Museo Universal and La Campana de Gracia; as well as for magazines outside Spain, such as L'Illustration, the Illustrirte Zeitung and Le Monde Illustré.

References

Further reading 
 Salvador Bori, Tres maestros del lápiz de la Barcelona ochocentista: Padró, Planas, Pellicer, Librería Milla, 1945 (Google Books)
 Antonio Elias de Molins, Diccionario biográfico y bibliográfico de escritores y artistas catalanes del siglo XIX, Fidel Giró, 1889 (Online)
 Joaquim Fontanals i del Castillo, Recuerdo al artista Tomás Padró, C. Verdaguer, 1877 (Online)

External links 

1840 births
1877 deaths
Artists from Catalonia
19th-century Spanish male artists
Spanish illustrators
Spanish satirists
Real Academia de Bellas Artes de San Fernando alumni
People from Barcelona